Airampoa is a South American genus of the cactus family (Cactaceae).

Species
Species of the genus Airampoa according to Plants of the World Online :

References

External links

Opuntioideae genera
Opuntioideae